Hossein Alavi is an Iranian football player He has just played 13 minutes in his entire career before joining Esteghlal which made his signing heavily criticised by media. It has been reported that a member of The Iranian Parliament had pressured Ali Fathollahzadeh to sign Alavi, which he rejects.

References

External links
 Hossein Alavi at Persian League

Iranian footballers
Living people
1989 births
Esteghlal F.C. players
Association football forwards